Franciscus Manini (died 1619) was a Roman Catholic prelate who served as Bishop of Novigrad (1607–1619).

Biography
On 4 Jul 1607, he was appointed during the papacy of Pope Paul V as Bishop of Novigrad.
On 8 Jul 1607, he was consecrated bishop by Ludovico de Torres, Archbishop of Monreale, with Juan de Rada, Bishop of Patti, and Metello Bichi, Bishop Emeritus of Sovana, serving as co-consecrators.
He served as Bishop of Novigrad until his death in Sep 1619.

References

External links and additional sources
 (for Chronology of Bishops) 
 (for Chronology of Bishops) 

17th-century Roman Catholic bishops in Croatia
Bishops appointed by Pope Paul V
1619 deaths